Bau-Bataillon 87 (Construction Battalion 87) was an auxiliary unit of the Wehrmacht (Nazi Germany) during World War II. The personnel were a German cadre and nationals of Central Asia (1., 2., 3. Turkestanische Kompanie). It was formed on August 26, 1939. On September 23, 1943 it was renamed Bau-Pionier-Bataillon 87 (Construction Engineering Battalion).

References

Military units and formations of the Wehrmacht